Žabare may refer to:

 Žabare (Kruševac), a village in Serbia
 Žabare (Topola), a village in Serbia